Donald David McDonald (March 13, 1862 – June 1939) was a farmer and political figure in Prince Edward Island. He represented 3rd Queens in the Legislative Assembly of Prince Edward Island from 1916 to 1923 and from 1928 to 1931 as a Liberal.

He was the son of Donald A. McDonald and was educated in Glenfinnan, Prince Edward Island. He was married twice: to Mary J. McIntyre in 1894 and to Mary McDonald in 1924. McDonald served as census commissioner for Queens County in 1901 and 1911. He also served as a justice of the peace. McDonald was defeated when he ran for a seat in the provincial assembly in 1912 and when he ran for reelection in 1923. He served in the province's Executive Council as a minister without portfolio. McDonald was speaker for the legislative assembly from 1928 to 1931. He died in Glenfinnan at the age of 77.

References 

Speakers of the Legislative Assembly of Prince Edward Island
Prince Edward Island Liberal Party MLAs
1862 births
1939 deaths